Syllepte xanthothorax is a moth in the family Crambidae. It is found in the Democratic Republic of Congo, Ghana, Guinea, Ivory Coast and Sierra Leone.

The larvae feed on Cola nitida.

References

Moths described in 1933
xanthothorax
Moths of Africa